South Devon College is a further education college with 9 different campuses within Torbay and the surrounding area. The college is part of The University of Plymouth Colleges network.

In December 2017, South Devon College achieved an overall grade 2 - 'Good' - in an inspection by OFSTED. South Devon College was also ranked the Number one Further Education and Tertiary College in England in 2014.

Campuses

Paignton Campus
There are three campuses in Paignton. The Vantage Point Campus, is the college's Main Campus.

 Vantage Point includes a main, three-story building and separate buildings for automotive repair and construction and on site Nursery
 The University Centre is home to University Centre South Devon which is TEF Gold rated and features lecture and seminar rooms with projection and audio technology. Rooms also have the facility to record lectures. The campus is located at Long Road, Paignton, TQ4 7EJ.
 The South West Energy Centre (SWEC) is a solar-powered building combining such course as Business, Accounting, Plumbing and Electrical. The campus is located Long Road, Paignton TQ4 7BJ.
 South Devon High School is based at South Devon College, Paignton Campus. South Devon High School gives pupils at Key Stage 4 (pupils entering year 10) to choose up to three technical qualifications to study, including Digital Media and Creative Arts, Electronic Principles, Sports Science, Hospitality, Sustainable Construction, Childcare and Development, Health and Social Care. The campus is located at Vantage Point, Long Road, Paignton, TQ4 7EJ.

Newton Abbot Campus
There are two campuses in Newton Abbot which are:

 The Automotive Skills Centre has fully equipped workshops to develop practical skills. They deliver Automotive courses from Entry Level to Level 3, as well as apprenticeships. The campus is located at Bradley Lane, Newton Abbot, TQ12 1LZ.
 The Brunel Centre is a fully equipped construction centre. Courses covering the construction trades are run in workshops here. The campus is located at Brunel Industrial Estate, Collett Way, Newton Abbot TQ12 4PH.

Torquay Campus
Torquay has one main campus focusing on Health and Care professions.

 The Centre for Health and Care Professions. The campus is situated at 187 Newton Road, Torquay, TQ2 7FT.

Kingswear Campus
Kingswear has one campus which is based on the banks of the River Dart.

 South Devon Marine Academy is a centre of excellence for marine training and education. The Academy boasts 2 38 ft yachts, 5 rigid hulled inflatable boats (RIBs), 2 displacement boats, workshops and research and development facilities. The location of this campus is Noss on Dart Marina, Bridge Rd, Kingswear, Dartmouth TQ6 0EA.

Sources
 Offsted Report

External Links to Official Website & Social Media 

South Devon College (Official Website)
South Devon College (Facebook) 
South Devon College (Twitter)

Further education colleges in Devon
Education in Torbay